Harish Chandra Mathur (4 June 1904 – July 1968) was politician and administrator from Rajasthan state. He was elected to Lok Sabha from Jalore in 1962 and from Pali in 1957 . He was a minister in congress governments. HCM Rajasthan State Institute of Public Administration is named after him.

References 

Indian elections and legislators By S. P. Singh Sud, Ajit Singh Sud

Rajasthani politicians
1904 births
1968 deaths
India MPs 1957–1962
India MPs 1962–1967
Indian National Congress politicians
Lok Sabha members from Rajasthan
Rajya Sabha members from Rajasthan
Members of the Constituent Assembly of India
People from Pali district
Indian National Congress politicians from Rajasthan